This is a list of Progress Party MPs.  It includes all Members of Parliament elected to the Parliament of Norway (Stortinget) representing the Progress Party from 1973. Until 1977, the name of the party was Anders Lange's Party. The party was not represented in Parliament between 1977 and 1981.



List of MPs

A
John Alvheim, Telemark, 1989–2005
Per-Willy Amundsen, Troms, 2005–present
Torbjørn Andersen, Aust-Agder, 1997–2009
Anders Anundsen, Vestfold, 2005–present
Hans Frode Asmyhr, Akershus, 2005–present

B
Petter Bjørheim, Rogaland, 1989–93
Per Roar Bredvold, Hedmark, 1997–present
Stephen Bråthen, Akershus, 1993–94

C
Ellen Chr. Christiansen, Oslo, 1993–94

D
Dag Danielsen, Oslo, 1997–2001

E
Jan Arild Ellingsen, Nordland, 2001–present
Robert Eriksson, Nord-Trøndelag, 2005–present
Erling Erland, Rogaland, 1973–77
Ursula Evje, Akershus, 1997–2004

F
Kåre Fostervold, Telemark, 2005–09
Jan-Henrik Fredriksen, Finnmark, 2005–present
Jan Erik Fåne, Akershus, 1989–93

G
Vigdis Giltun, Østfold, 2005–present
Erik Gjems-Onstad, Akershus, 1973–76
Ingebjørg Godskesen, Aust-Agder, 2009–present
Oskar Jarle Grimstad, Møre og Romsdal, 2009–present
Fridtjof Frank Gundersen, Akershus, 1981–85; 1989–2001
Jon Jæger Gåsvatn, Østfold, 2005–present

H
Carl I. Hagen, Oslo, 1981–2009
Gjermund Hagesæter, Hordaland, 2001–present
Mette Hanekamhaug, Møre og Romsdal, 2009–present
Knut Hanselmann, Hordaland, 1989–93
Øystein Hedstrøm, Østfold, 1989–2005
Oscar D. Hillgaar, Vestfold, 1989–94
Bård Hoksrud, Telemark, 2005–present
Solveig Horne, Rogaland, 2005–present
Morten Høglund, Akershus, 2001–present

I

J
Harry Jensen, Nordland, 1989–90
Siv Jensen, Oslo, 1997–present
Morten Ørsal Johansen, Oppland, 2009–present

K
Kari Kjønaas Kjos, Akershus, 2005–present
Vidar Kleppe, Vest-Agder, 1989–93; 1997–2001
Terje Knudsen, Hordaland, 1997–2001
Ulf Erik Knudsen, Buskerud, 1997–present
Øyvind Korsberg, Troms, 1997–present
André Kvakkestad, Akershus, 2001–2005

L
Anders Lange, Oslo, 1973–74
Ulf Leirstein, Østfold, 2005–present
Tord Lien, Sør-Trøndelag, 2005–present

M
Jens Marcussen, Rogaland, 1981–85; 1989–93
Steinar Maribo, Buskerud, 1989–93
Åse Michaelsen, Vest-Agder, 2005–present
Per Erik Monsen, Vestfold, 1997–2005
Peter N. Myhre, Oslo, 2009–present

N
Harald T. Nesvik, Møre og Romsdal, 1997–present
Thore A. Nistad, Oppland, 1997–2009
Terje Nyberget, Troms, 1989–93

O
Per Arne Olsen, Vestfold, 2009–present

P

Q

R
Peder I. Ramsrud, Oppland, 1989–93
Laila Marie Reiertsen, Hordaland, 2009–present
Per Risvik, Sør-Trøndelag, 1989–93
Jørund Rytman, Buskerud, 2005–present
Henrik Rød, Østfold, 2001–05
Hans J. Røsjorde, Hordaland, 1989–93

S
Per Sandberg, Nord-Trøndelag, 1997–2005; Sør-Trøndelag, 2005–present
Jan Simonsen, Rogaland, 1989–2001
Pål Atle Skjervengen, Oslo, 1989–93
Henning Skumsvoll, Vest-Agder, 2005–present
Harald Bjarne Slettebø, Hordaland, 1973–77
Lodve Solholm, Hordaland, 1989–93; 1997–2009
Ketil Solvik-Olsen, Rogaland, 2005–present
Arne Sortevik, Hordaland, 2001–present
Jørn L. Stang, Østfold, 1997–2001
Åge Starheim, Sogn og Fjordane, 2005–present
Christopher Stensaker, Sør-Trøndelag, 1997–2005
Kenneth Svendsen, Nordland, 1997–present

T
Ib Thomsen, Akershus, 2005–present
Finn Thoresen, Akershus, 1989–92
Bente Thorsen, Rogaland, 2009–present
Torgeir Trældal, Nordland, 2009–present
Christian Tybring-Gjedde, Oslo, 2005–present

U

V
Øyvind Vaksdal, Rogaland, 1997–present

W
Tor Mikkel Wara, Oslo, 1989–93
Roy N. Wetterstad, Buskerud, 1993–94
Per Ove Width, Vestfold, 1997–2009
Karin S. Woldseth, Hordaland, 2001–present

X

Y
Bjørn Erling Ytterhorn, Hordaland, 1981–87
Inger-Marie Ytterhorn, Hordaland, 1989–93

Z

Notes

Progress Party (Norway)